A safe access zone (SAZ) is a form of legal protection of access to abortion and is a specified distance around a reproductive healthcare clinic or service in which anti-abortion picketers cannot demonstrate, stand or communicate with patients and/or staff that enter and exit the reproductive facility. This helps to prevent pregnant girls and women that are seeking abortion services from being intimidated and harassed by anti-abortion picketers. In most states in Australia, safe access zones are an area of 150 metres around the entire reproductive health facility, which is equivalent to approximately 492 feet. Safe access zones are a legislative matter, meaning laws allowing safe access zones are necessary.

As of August 12, 2021, all states and territories in Australia have safe access zones in place. Western Australia was the last state to implement safe access zones.

A safe access zone may be referred to as an exclusion zone.

There are legal protections of access to abortion in other countries.

References 

Abortion in Australia